The 4th Michigan Infantry Regiment was an infantry regiment that served in the Union Army during the American Civil War.  The 4th Michigan wore a very Americanized zouave uniform.  This uniform consisted of a Federal dark blue 4 button sack coat, dark blue chasseur trousers, tan gaiters, and a maroon zouave fez with a light blue tassel.

Service
The 4th Michigan Infantry was organized at Adrian, Michigan and mustered into Federal service for a three-year enlistment on June 20, 1861. The regiment's first lieutenant colonel was a future prominent politician and civil engineer, William Ward Duffield. Several other soldiers in the regiment reached post-war prominence, including politician George Spalding and Major General Alfred E. Bates, who enlisted as privates in Company A.

The regiment was mustered out on June 30, 1864. The regiment's veterans and recruits were assigned to the 1st Michigan Infantry.The Fourth Michigan Infantry was reorganized under orders of July 26, 1864 and mustered into Federal service as a regiment on October 14, 1864. On May 26, 1866, the regiment was mustered out of service in Houston, Texas.

Total strength and casualties
The regiment suffered 12 officers and 177 enlisted men who were killed in action or mortally wounded and 1 officer and 107 enlisted men who died of disease, for a total of 297 
fatalities.

Commanders
Colonel Dwight A. Woodbury, killed at the Battle of Malvern Hill, July 1, 1862
Colonel Harrison Jeffords, killed at the Battle of Gettysburg
Colonel Jonathan W. Childs Antietam
Colonel George W. Lumbard, died on May 6, 1864, from the wounds he received in action on the previous day at Wilderness, Virginia.

4th Michigan Soldiers

See also
List of Michigan Civil War Units
Michigan in the American Civil War

References

Further reading
Dyer, Frederick Henry. A Compendium of the War of the Rebellion. 3 vols. New York: Thomas Yoseloff, 1959.
Barrett, Orvey S. Reminiscences, Incidents, Battles, Marches and Camp Life of the Old 4th Michigan Infantry in War of Rebellion, 1861 to 1864. Detroit, Michigan: W.S. Ostler, 1888.
Bertera, Martin. The 4th Michigan Infantry at the Battle of New Bridge, Virginia. Wyandotte. Michigan: M. Bertera, 2002. 
Bertera, Martin N, and Kim Crawford. The 4th Michigan Infantry in the Civil War. East Lansing: Michigan State University Press, 2010.
Turner, George H. Record of Service of Michigan Volunteers in the Civil War, 1861-1865; Record of Fourth Michigan Infantry in the Civil War, 1861-1865. Bethesda, Maryland: University Publications of America, 1993.

External links
The Civil War Archive
The Fourth Michigan Infantry website
The monument to the Fourth Michigan Volunteers at Gettysburg

Units and formations of the Union Army from Michigan
1861 establishments in Michigan
Military units and formations established in 1861
Military units and formations disestablished in 1864